Western Avenue is the name of a railroad station owned by Metra, located in the West Town community area of Chicago, Illinois near Western Avenue. Western Avenue station serves the Milwaukee District West Line, North Central Service, and Milwaukee District North Line, and is the last inbound stop for these three lines before the terminus at Union Station. Although it is not a station stop, Amtrak Hiawatha Service trains and the Empire Builder also pass through here. The station was previously used by the Chicago, Milwaukee, St. Paul and Pacific Railroad. Located near the station are the California Coach Yard, and the Western Avenue Rail Yard, the latter of which host to Metra's final EMD F40Cs. Just southeast of the station platforms is a diamond where the Milwaukee Road Metra routes cross the tracks of the Union Pacific West Line to Ogilvie Transportation Center, then turn to run parallel to them. This goes on for about a mile before they split, as the West Line tracks continue to Ogilvie. The junction is controlled by the nearby A-2 tower.

As of 2018, Western Avenue is the 61st busiest of Metra's 236 non-downtown stations, with an average of 836 weekday boardings.

Western Avenue is served by a total of 117 Metra trains on weekdays, by 44 trains on Saturdays, and by 36 trains on Sundays and holidays. This includes all inbound trains from the three lines, as well as all outbound trains save for one outbound Milwaukee District North Line train on weekdays.

Station Layout

Bus connections
CTA
  49 Western (Owl Service) 
  X49 Western Express (weekday rush hours only) 
  65 Grand

References

External links

Station House from Google Maps Street View

Western Avenue (Metra)
Former Chicago, Milwaukee, St. Paul and Pacific Railroad stations
Railway stations in the United States opened in 1900